beIN Sports is an Australian and New Zealander pay television sports network that was launched in 2007 as Setanta Sports.

In late 2014, Setanta Sports Australia was acquired by the beIN Media Group. As a result, on 24 November 2014, the channel was rebranded as beIN Sports.

The channel airs football, Rugby Union, tennis and European handball events. Its broadcast rights include Football League Cup, Football League Championship, Ligue 1, German Bundesliga, La Liga, Italian Serie A, SPFL, RBS 6 Nations, Major League Soccer and WTA.

In September 2019, Sky Sport ink four-year partnership with beIN for extensive soccer coverage. In New Zealand, beIN Sports is broadcast as Sky Sports 7, and is promoted as Sky Sports 7 beIN Sports.

Programming

Current 
beIN Sports football rights include:
CONMEBOL
2022 World Cup qualifiers
Libertadores (through 2026)
Sudamericana (through 2026)
Recopa (through 2026)
International Champions Cup
EFL (including Cup)
 Italian Serie A
Africa Futsal Cup of Nations
 Ligue 1
Coupe de France
 Bundesliga
DFL-Supercup
Scottish Premiership
Scottish Cup
Scottish Challenge Cup
Scottish League Cup
Süper Lig (through 2022 *** No longer shown)
ÖFB Cup (final only) (2020–present)
Major League Soccer (through 2022)

Australia only

Rugby Union
beIN Sports rights include:

 Ireland Home Internationals
 Wales Home Internationals
 Scotland Home Internationals
 Argentina Home Internationals
 All Blacks Spring Tour

Tennis 
beIN Sports rights include:
WTA Tour
Davis Cup
Fed Cup

Table tennis 
beIN Sports rights include:

 T2 Diamond

Handball 
beIN Sports rights include:

 European Men's Handball Championship (2020-)

Motorsport 
beIN Sports rights include:

 Deutsche Tourenwagen Masters

Former

Football 

Copa América (2015, 2016, and 2019)
Premier League (2016-2019) (NZ only)
Coupe de la Ligue (until 2020)
KNVB Cup (2017–18 only)
Argentine Primera División (2016-2019)
Campeonato Brasileiro Série A

See also

List of sports television channels
beIN Sports
beIN Sports France
beIN Sports USA
beIN Sports Canada
beIN Sports MENA
beIN Sports Turkey

References

External links 
 Official website
 beIN Sports Connect

BeIN Sports
Al Jazeera
Television channels and stations established in 2007
2007 establishments in Australia
English-language television stations in Australia
Sports television networks in Australia